Daniel Plummer (born 2 January 1957) is a former Belgian racing cyclist. He rode the 1980 Tour de France.

References

External links

1957 births
Living people
Belgian male cyclists
People from Bastogne
Cyclists from Luxembourg (Belgium)